William Thomas Havard  (23 October 1889 – 17 August 1956) was a Welsh clergyman and rugby union international player. He served as a military chaplain during the First World War, and later as Bishop of St Asaph and then Bishop of St David's in the Church in Wales.

Early life
Havard was born in Defynnog, Brecknockshire, the third son of William Havard, a deacon of the local congregational chapel, and his wife Gwen. He attended Brecon county school before studying at University College of Wales, Aberystwyth, where he graduated with a 3rd-class BA degree in history in 1912. Having been raised in the congregationalist Christian tradition, he was confirmed as a member of the Church in Wales after graduating. He then trained for ordination at St Michael's College, Llandaff and was ordained deacon in 1913 and priest in 1914. He was curate of Llanelli from 1913 to 1915.

First World War
During the First World War, Havard served as chaplain to the 10th Battalion, South Wales Borderers, which formed part of the 115th Brigade in the 38th (Welsh) Division, serving from 1915 to 1919. He retained an honorary commission as chaplain to the forces, 4th class. He was Mentioned in Despatches in 1917 (Haig's despatch of 9 April), and was awarded the Military Cross in the 1918 New Year Honours.

Oxford
After the war, Havard returned to St Albans Church, Llanelli Where he was now Revd to the newly finished church 1919-1920 (he had previously served there between 1913-1915 while it was just the crypt)

Havard was chaplain of Jesus College, Oxford, from 1919 to 1921. While there, he took a degree in modern history, graduating in 1921.

Sports

Rugby
A keen sportsman, Havard played rugby at all levels, representing Brecon Secondary School while a schoolboy, and continuing through university and finally joining Llanelli and later London Welsh at club level.

On 21 April 1919, Havard played for Wales in a tour match against the New Zealand Army. This was Havard's only match for Wales; New Zealand won the match 6–3.

Havard was an Oxford blue, playing for Oxford in The Varsity Match of 1919. He was also part of the Jesus College rugby team that won the inter-collegiate cup in 1920.

Football
Havard also played football to a high standard, playing for Swansea Town. In September 1912, two days before the Swansea Town's first Southern League match, Havard was in the reserve team in a match against Merthyr and scored Swansea's first goal in their first competitive season. In January 1914, Havard had recently played football for Llanelli, prompting objections that this should debar him from playing rugby for Llanelli as an amateur: he was allowed to play one match, but not another.

Church career
After leaving Oxford, Havard became curate of Brecon (1921–22), vicar of Hook (1922–24), vicar of St Luke's, Battersea (1924–28) and vicar of St Mary's, Swansea (1928–34).  He was a canon of Brecon Cathedral from 1930 to 1934.  He succeeded A. G. Edwards as Bishop of St Asaph in September 1934 when Edwards retired.  He had in 1923 he returned to a more active army role, joining the Territorials in his previous grade on 8 May 1923, he was then promoted to Chaplain, 3rd class on 21 February 1925 before being appointed to a reserve commission on 6 January 1934, which he retained until reaching the age-limit for the position in 1949, when he was again granted an honorary commission. On 18 June 1940 he was appointed a Chaplain and Sub-Prelate of the Venerable Order of Saint John. He was translated to St David's in succession to David Prosser in 1950.

He was regarded as a powerful preacher in both Welsh and in English, with his sermon on the Sunday before the National Eisteddfod often being broadcast. He was Select Preacher at St. Andrew's University (1943) and Canterbury (1946), and travelled to Yale University in 1951 as a special lecturer and preacher.  He was prominent in educational activities, chairing the education council of the Church in Wales, and acting as Visitor to St David's College, Llandovery College, Trinity College, Carmarthen and St John's College, Ystrad Meurig.

Havard died on 17 August 1956, and was buried in Brecon. His memorial is in the Havard Chapel of Brecon Cathedral.

References

1889 births
1956 deaths
Welsh military personnel
20th-century bishops of the Church in Wales
Alumni of Aberystwyth University
Alumni of St Michael's College, Llandaff
Alumni of Jesus College, Oxford
Association footballers not categorized by position
Bishops of St Asaph
Bishops of St Davids
British Army personnel of World War I
English footballers
Llanelli RFC players
London Welsh RFC players
Oxford University RFC players
People from Brecknockshire
Recipients of the Military Cross
Royal Army Chaplains' Department officers
Rugby union players from Powys
Swansea City A.F.C. players
Wales international rugby union players
Welsh military chaplains
Welsh rugby union players
World War I chaplains
Rugby union props